João Afonso Crispim (born 9 February 1995), known as João Afonso, is a Brazilian footballer who plays as a defensive midfielder for Marítimo in Portugal.

Club career
João Afonso is a youth product from Sport Club Internacional. He made his Série A debut at 13 October 2013 against Náutico.

On 29 June 2019, Afonso joined Portuguese club Gil Vicente. After three seasons playing for the Barcelos club, Afonso moved to Marítimo in 2022.

References

External links

1995 births
Living people
People from Criciúma
Brazilian footballers
Brazilian expatriate footballers
Association football midfielders
Campeonato Brasileiro Série A players
Campeonato Brasileiro Série B players
Primeira Liga players
Esporte Clube Novo Hamburgo players
Sport Club Internacional players
Associação Chapecoense de Futebol players
Criciúma Esporte Clube players
Grêmio Esportivo Brasil players
Goiás Esporte Clube players
Gil Vicente F.C. players
C.S. Marítimo players
Brazilian expatriate sportspeople in Portugal
Expatriate footballers in Portugal
Sportspeople from Santa Catarina (state)